Tagir Kamaludinovich Khaybulaev (born 24 July 1984 in Kizilyurt, Dagestan, Soviet Union) is a Russian judoka of Avar descent. He currently represents Samara in international and domestic championships.

2012 Olympics 
In the 2012 Summer Olympics, Tagir won his country's 3rd gold medal by defeating the defending champion Tuvshinbayar Naidan of Mongolia to win the men's under-100 kg Olympic judo title.

Career 
Tagir Khaibulaev currently lives in Samara, Russia. He attends the Dinamo Judo Academy.

In January 2017, he took a temporary pause in his career, but on December 17 of the same year he announced its completion.

References

External links

 
 
 

1984 births
Avar people
Living people
Russian male judoka
People from Kizilyurt
Judoka at the 2012 Summer Olympics
Judoka at the 2016 Summer Olympics
Olympic judoka of Russia
Olympic medalists in judo
Olympic gold medalists for Russia
Medalists at the 2012 Summer Olympics
Sportspeople from Dagestan
20th-century Russian people
21st-century Russian people